USS Concise (AM-163) was an Admirable-class minesweeper built for the U.S. Navy during World War II. She was built to clear minefields in offshore waters, and served the Navy in the Pacific Ocean.

She was reclassified AM-163, 21 February 1942; launched 6 February 1943 by Willamette Iron and Steel Works, Portland, Oregon; and commissioned 25 April 1944.

World War II Pacific Ocean operations 
Sailing from San Francisco, California, 3 July 1944 for Pearl Harbor, Concise arrived 13 July for training. She swept mines at French Frigate Shoals from 6 August to 16 August then sailed to Eniwetok, arriving 28 September. Assigned to convoy escort duty until 11 August 1945 Concise arrived off Okinawa, 30 August. On 8 September she sailed to clear mines from Japanese waters in protection of occupation shipping, sweeping off Wakayama, Osaka, and Nagoya until 20 November.

Post-War Decommissioning  
Concise returned to San Francisco, California, 16 December 1945 and was placed out of commission in reserve 31 May 1946 at San Diego, California. She was reclassified MSF-163 on 7 February 1955.

Awards 
Concise received one battle star for World War II service.

References

External links
 

 

Admirable-class minesweepers
World War II mine warfare vessels of the United States
Ships built in Portland, Oregon
1943 ships